Merry Christmas is a 2001 Italian Cinepanettone comedy film directed by Neri Parenti.

Cast

Production
The film was Filmauro's annual Christmas comedy. It was originally titled Christmas in New York. It was filming at Fiumicino Airport in Rome, Italy on 11 September 2001 and was due to film in New York for four weeks 4 days later. Following the 11 September 2001 attacks, production was stopped for a month and the script rewritten to change the location to Amsterdam.

Reception
The film opened at the top of the Italian box office with a first week gross of 11.7 billion lire ($5.6 million) and remained there for a second week, grossing $13.5 million in 12 days. It was the first Filmauro comedy to be the Christmas number one since A spasso nel tempo in 1996.

See also
 List of Christmas films

References

External links

2001 films
Films directed by Neri Parenti
Films scored by Bruno Zambrini
2000s Italian-language films
2000s Christmas comedy films
Italian Christmas comedy films
2000s Italian films